Oenosandridae is a family of Australian noctuoid moths. Genera include:

Diceratucha
Discophlebia
Nycteropa
Oenosandra

References

 Fullard, J.H. 2006: Evolution of hearing in moths: the ears of Oenosandra boisduvalii (Noctuoidea: Oenosandridae). Australian journal of zoology, 54: 51–56. 
 Kuznetzov, V.I.; Naumann, C.M.; Speidel, W.; Stekolnikov, A.A. 2004: The skeleton and musculature of male and female terminalia in Oenosandra boisduvalii Newman, 1856 and the phylogenetic position of the family Oenosandridae (Insecta: Lepidoptera). SHILAP Revista de Lepidopterologia, 32: 297-313.
 Miller, J.S. 1991: Cladistics and classification of the Notodontidae (Lepidoptera, Noctuoidea) based on larval and adult morphology. Bulletin of the American Museum of Natural History, (204). 

 
Moth families